Hicham Mahdoufi (born 5 August 1983, in Khouribga) is a professional footballer.

Career
Mahdoufi was born in Khouribga. During his teenage years, he began playing for his local club, Olympique Khouribga. In summer 2007, a number of European clubs began taking an interest in him. In July, Mahdoufi trained with Dynamo Kyiv and on was loaned out to the club. Having played several matches for the second team, he failed to secure a place in the first team, and on August 30, Dynamo announced that Mahdoufi would be loaned to FC Metalist Kharkiv. He scored his first goal for Metalist against Everton in the UEFA Cup on 4 October 2007. On 17 June 2010 resigned his contract with his youthclub Olympique Khouribga.

International career
Mahdoufi is also a member of the Morocco national football team.

Notes

External links
 
 

1983 births
Living people
FC Dynamo Kyiv players
FC Dynamo-2 Kyiv players
FC Metalist Kharkiv players
Raja CA players
Moroccan footballers
Morocco international footballers
Moroccan expatriate footballers
Expatriate footballers in Ukraine
Moroccan expatriate sportspeople in Ukraine
2008 Africa Cup of Nations players
Ukrainian Premier League players
Ukrainian First League players
People from Khouribga
Olympique Club de Khouribga players
Association football defenders
Association football midfielders